Samuel Hanford (April 22, 1674 – February 2, 1751) was a member of the Connecticut House of Representatives from Norwalk in the sessions of October 1705, May 1707, May 1708, May 1711, May 1714, October 1717, October 1719, May 1720, October 1722, October 1733, May and October 1735, May and October 1736, and May and October 1737. He also served as Norwalk town clerk from 1707 to 1708.
He served as a justice of the peace for Norwalk in 1711, 1723, 1724, and from 1735 until his death in 1751. He served as a selectman for seven years.

He was the son of Reverend Thomas Hanford and Mary Miles.

References 

1674 births
1751 deaths
Burials in East Norwalk Historical Cemetery
Connecticut city council members
Members of the Connecticut House of Representatives
American justices of the peace
Politicians from Norwalk, Connecticut
City and town clerks
People of colonial Connecticut